Palalda is a former commune in Pyrénées-Orientales, now part of Amélie-les-Bains-Palalda.

Geography 
Palalda is located above the river Tech, to the northeast of Amélie-les-Bains and to the east of Montbolo.

History 
The first mention of Palalda is from the year 814, as being the western limit of the territory of Céret.

On 1 October 1942, the commune of Palalda is linked to Amélie-les-Bains to create the new commune of Amélie-les-Bains-Palalda.

Politics and administration

Canton 
In 1790, Palalda is included in the canton of Arles, which remains the same after being united to Amélie-les-bains in 1942.

Mayors

Demography 
Ancien Régime
Population under the Ancien Régime is calculated either in number of feu fiscal (f, fire tax), or in number of inhabitants (H).

Modern times

Sites of interest 
 The romanesque church of Saint Martin, built in the 12th century and partly rebuilt between the 15th and 16th centuries.

Culture 
Poetry
 Confidences d'un moutard parisien (1912) is a poem by the writer Marc Anfossi which mentions Palalda, Montbolo and Montalba-d'Amélie.

See also 

 Communes of the Pyrénées-Orientales department

Notes 

Former communes of Pyrénées-Orientales